Balancing may refer to:

 Balancing (international relations)
 Balancing and deranking, in grammar the use in subordinate clauses of verb forms identical to those in main clauses
 Balancing (bridge), a term in contract bridge
 Battery balancing, a technique that improves the available capacity of a battery pack with multiple cells
 "Balancing" (Brooklyn Nine-Nine), an episode of the eighth season of Brooklyn Nine-Nine
 "Balancing", an episode of the television series Teletubbies

See also
 Balance (disambiguation)
 Load balancing (disambiguation)